Mele Kolo Kyari OFR (born 8 January 1965) is a Nigerian geologist, crude oil marketer and 1st
Group Chief executive officer (GCEO) of the Nigerian National Petroleum company limited  (NNPC limited). Before this appointment, Kyari was the Group General Manager, Crude Oil Marketing Division of the NNPC and the Nigerian National Representative at the Organization of Petroleum Exporting Countries (OPEC) since 2018.

Early life and education
Kyari was born on 8 January 1965 in Maiduguri, Borno State. He attended Government Community Secondary School Biu in Borno State between 1977 and 1982. In 1987, he obtained his Bachelor of Science (BSc) in geology and earth science from the University of Maiduguri.

Career 
After the retirement of Maikanti Baru from the corporation on 7 July 2019, Kyari was appointed by the administration of President Muhammadu Buhari as the 19th GMD of the Nigerian National Petroleum Corporation. In 1991, he joined NNPC Processing Geophysicist with Integrated Data Services Limited. In 1991, he started his career with the Department of Geological Survey of Nigeria as Field Geologist. He worked as an Exploration Geophysicist with the National Petroleum Investment Management Services (NAPIMS) in 1998. In 2007, Kyari headed the Production Sharing Contracts Management in Crude Oil Marketing Division (COMD). In 2014, he became the General Manager, Crude Oil Stock Management while in 2015 he was promoted to the post of Group General Manager, COMD. He's the focal person for the Open Government Initiative, the initiative helps the government to track the buyer and seller of crude oil. On 13 May 2018, he became the Nigerian National Representative at OPEC.

Awards and recognition 
In October 2022, President Muhammadu Buhari conferred a national honour of the Order of the Federal Republic (OFR) on Kyari.

References

1965 births
Buhari administration personnel
Petroleum ministers of Nigeria
Living people
People from Borno State